Ola Rosling (born 1 November 1975 in Uppsala, Sweden) is a Swedish statistician known for his work for the Gapminder Foundation on changing global quality of life. He is the chairman, director and co-founder of the foundation.

Career
Rosling co-founded the Gapminder Foundation together with his wife Anna Rosling Rönnlund and his father Hans Rosling. Ola led the development of the Trendalyzer software that creates interactive graphics from statistical datasets. The software was bought by Google in 2007 and Rosling and his team worked for Google from then on. He became Google's Public Data product manager.

Ola and Anna Rosling collaborated with Hans Rosling and co-authored the book called Factfulness.

Publication

References

Living people
Swedish statisticians
Swedish businesspeople
1975 births